William Oswald may refer to:

William D. Oswald (born 1936), leader in The Church of Jesus Christ of Latter-day Saints
William J. Oswald (1919–2005), American scientist and educator